Kareena Kapoor Khan (born 21 September 1980) is an Indian actress who appears in Bollywood films. She has received numerous awards and nominations for Best Actress or Best Supporting Actress.

For her acting debut in J. P. Dutta's 2000 film Refugee, Kapoor received the Best Female Debut award at the 46th Filmfare Awards. In addition to her Filmfare Award, she received three additional Best Debut awards – at the Bollywood Movie, International Indian Film Academy Awards (IIFA) and Sansui ceremonies – and the Lux Face of the Year award at the Zee Cine Awards. The following year, Kapoor featured in the critically acclaimed drama Asoka (for which she received a nomination for the Filmfare Award for Best Actress) and appeared as a supporting actress in Karan Johar’s family drama Kabhi Khushi Kabhie Gham... with Shah Rukh Khan, Kajol, Amitabh Bachchan, Hrithik Roshan and Jaya Bachchan (one of the biggest commercial successes to date of that time), which earned her a nomination for the Filmfare Award for Best Supporting Actress.

After negative reviews for a series of roles and being branded for “over-acting”, Kapoor was noted for her performance in Sudhir Mishra's Chameli (2004). Her portrayal of a sex worker in the film won her jury recognition at several award ceremonies, including Stardust and Filmfare. After Chameli, Kapoor featured in the critically acclaimed Dev (2004) and Omkara (2006), both of which earned her multiple nominations at various award ceremonies. In 2007, she received high critical acclaim and several awards for her performance in the romantic comedy Jab We Met, including her first Filmfare Award for Best Actress. In 2009, she again received high critical acclaim for her performances in the terrorism thriller Kurbaan (2009) and the Aamir Khan-starrer and Rajkumar Hirani-directed 3 Idiots (2009). For her work in both the films, Khan won the Screen Award for Best Actress (Popular Choice) and received an IIFA Award for Best Actress for her performance in 3 Idiots. In 2011, she received the Filmfare Award for Best Supporting Actress for her performance in the family drama We Are Family (2010).

The actress has also been recognized at major Indian film and fashion award functions, including a Zee Cine Award Queen of Hearts in 2002 and an IIFA Award for Style Diva of the Year in 2004. That year she was also recognized for Celebrity Style (Female) at the Bollywood Fashion Awards, and two years later received the Most Glamorous Actress of the Year award at the Tuscan Verve Zoom Glam Awards. In 2009, Kapoor was among five actresses nominated for Star of the Decade – Female at the 10th annual IIFA Awards. Khan has also received achievement awards from a number of organizations; in 2009 she received Rotary International's Vocational Excellence Award for her film achievements at a young age, and the India Today Woman Award for her contributions to art and cinema.

Apsara Film & Television Producers Guild Awards
The Apsara Film & Television Producers Guild Award is presented by the Bollywood film industry to honour and recognize the professional excellence of their peers. Kapoor has received one award out of four nominations.

BIG Star Entertainment Awards
The BIG Star Entertainment Awards honour the Hindi film industry; Kapoor has won three awards out of Seven nominations.

Filmfare Awards
The Filmfare Awards is one of the oldest and most prominent Hindi film award ceremony. They are presented annually by The Times Group to honour both artistic and technical excellence. Kapoor has won six awards out of thirteen nominations, including a special award for her performance in Chameli (2004).

Global Indian Film Awards
The Global Indian Film Awards honoured the Hindi film industry from 2005 to 2007; Kapoor received two nominations.

GQ Men of The Year Awards (India)
GQ India gives away a number of Awards in various fields. One popular award is the GQ Men of the year award. Kapoor received one award.

HELLO! Hall of Fame Awards

International Indian Film Academy Awards
The International Indian Film Academy Awards are presented annually to honour the artistic and technical excellence of professionals in Bollywood (the Hindi language film industry). Kapoor has won four awards out of nine nominations, including a nomination for Star of the Decade – Female.

Lux Golden Rose Awards

Lokmot Maharashtra's Most Stylish Awards
• 2018 : Power Celebrity of the Year

Screen Awards
The Screen Awards are associated with the executive director and the governor of the Academy of Motion Picture Arts and Sciences. They are presented annually to honour professional excellence in the Hindi-language film industry. Kapoor has won three awards out of thirteen nominations, including five Jodi nominations (with Hrithik Roshan in 2002, Shahid Kapoor in 2005, 2008 and 2010, and Saif Ali Khan in 2010).

Stardust Awards
The Stardust Awards are presented annually by Stardust magazine; Kapoor has won seven awards out of eighteen nominations.

Zee Cine Awards
The Zee Cine Awards honour the Hindi film industry; kapoor has won three awards out of eight nominations.

Other Awards and Recognitions

Achievements

■2004 Honoured by Marco Ricci Society with Young Achiever Award

■2005 Honoured with Rajiv Gandhi Young Achiever Award,

■2005 Awarded as Indian Diva by Sahara One Television viewers.

■2006 Awarded the Smita Patil Memorial Award for her Contributions to the Hindi Film Industry,

■2008 Awarded with Global Achievement Award at Future Group Global Indian TV Honours.

■2009 Awarded India Today Woman Award for her contributions to art and cinema, in 2009

■2009 IIFA-FICCI Frames'  as the Most Powerful Entertainers of the Decade award

■2009 GQ Excellence Award for Achievement in films.

■2009 Awarded Celebrity Endorsement of the Year Award by Tech Life Awards

References

Lists of awards received by Indian actor